The Joint Intelligence Committee is a nodal government agency in several countries, responsible for the internal and external security apparatus of the respective nations.

 Joint Intelligence Committee (India)
 Joint Intelligence Committee (United Kingdom)
 National Committee for Intelligence Coordination (Bangladesh)

See also 
 Intelligence Committee (disambiguation)
 United States Joint Intelligence Community Council, formerly  U.S. Joint Intelligence Committee for the Joint Chiefs of Staff